The Saskatchewan Prairie Ice were a professional women's ice hockey team in the  Western Women's Hockey League  (WWHL). The team played its home games in  Lumsden, Saskatchewan, Canada.

History
After playing exhibition games throughout Saskatchewan in 2003-04, the Prairie Ice joined the Calgary Oval X-Treme, Minnesota Whitecaps,  Edmonton Chimos and British Columbia Breakers in forming the Western Women's Hockey League in 2004-2005. In 2006, the two leagues were reunited under the NWHL banner. However, this was short lived as the NWHL and WWHL could not reach an agreement upon a playoff schedule. As a result, the merger was not consummated. With the collapse of the NWHL in the summer of 2007, the Western Women's Hockey League was once again a completely independent league. The Prairie Ice have suspended operations in summer 2007.

Season-by-season
See also:  2004–05 WWHL season
See also:  2005–06 WWHL season
See also:  2006–07 WWHL season

Note: GP = Games played, W = Wins, L = Losses, T = Ties, GF = Goals for, GA = Goals against, Pts = Points,

Season standings

Last Roster 2006-07

Source:

Coaching Staff 2006-07

    General Manager: 
    Head Coach:    
    Assistant Coach:

Notable former players
 Emily Henry

See also
Western Women's Hockey League (WWHL)
List of ice hockey teams in Saskatchewan

References

External links
   Western Women's Hockey League Website

Western Women's Hockey League teams
Ice hockey teams in Saskatchewan
Women's ice hockey teams in Canada
Ice hockey clubs established in 2003
Defunct ice hockey teams in Canada
Defunct sports teams in Saskatchewan
Sports clubs disestablished in 2007
2003 establishments in Saskatchewan
2007 disestablishments in Saskatchewan
Lumsden No. 189, Saskatchewan
Women in Saskatchewan